Raicilla ("little root") is a distilled spirit originating in the south western part of the 
Mexican state of Jalisco. Like tequila and mezcal, it is a product of the agave plant.

Raicilla is a traditional beverage with about 300 years of history and a protected Denomination of Origin. Its aroma and flavor are derived from the species of agave and characterized by the soil, topography, climate, water, producer ("Maestro Raicillero"), yeasts, and other factors. Raicilla is colorless when it is matured in glass or yellowish when it is matured in wood.

Process
Raicilla is distilled in rudimentary stills from a fermented mash made from the central stem (piña) of the maguey plant. The mash is slow-cooked, and the steam condensed on a copper cone, cooled, traditionally, by spring water. To make a liter of Raicilla takes 10 kg of agave. Many different species of agaves are used to produce Raicilla, including Agave angustifolia ("Chico Aguiar" or "Yellow"), Agave maximiliana, Agave inaequidens and Agave rhodacantha.  It is usually more than 100 proof before water is added to control proof.

References 

Agave
Distilled drinks
Mexican alcoholic drinks